was an American educator and government adviser in Meiji period Japan.

Early life
Murray graduated from Union College in 1852.

Educator 
In 1857-1863, Murray was as principal of The Albany Academy in New York.  From 1863 to 1873,
he was a professor of mathematics, natural philosophy and astronomy at  
Rutgers College in New Jersey.  
Together with George Cook, Murray developed a full science curriculum at Rutgers, and successfully lobbied for Rutgers to be named the state's land grant college.
Their 1864-67 surveys established the marine boundary between New York and New Jersey, and their
1872 survey fixed the land boundary between New York and New Jersey. Murray was also responsible for the building of Rutgers' first astronomical observatory, the Daniel S. Schanck Observatory. In 1873, Murray departed Rutgers to become the educational advisor for the Japanese government. After his return, Murray served on the Rutgers College board of trustees from 1892 until his death in 1905.

In Japan, he was Superintendent of Educational Affairs in the Imperial Ministry of Education from 1873 through 1879.

Selected works
In a statistical overview derived from writings by and about David Murray, OCLC/WorldCat encompasses roughly 40+ works in 100+ publications in 2 languages and 1,000+ library holdings.

 
 
 
 
 The Development of Modern Education in Japan (1904)
 Japan. Continuing the History to the Close of 1905, with the Provisions of the Treaty of Portsmouth Between Russia and Japan (1906)

Notes

References
 Chamberlain, William Isaac. (1915).  In Memoriam, David Murray, Ph.D., LL. D., Superintendent of Educational Affairs in the Empire of Japan, and Adviser to the Japanese Imperial Minister of Education, 1873-1879. New York: private printing.  U.S. Library of Congress, online full-text;  OCLC 7578354
 Nussbaum, Louis-Frédéric and Käthe Roth. (2005).  Japan encyclopedia. Cambridge: Harvard University Press. ;  OCLC 58053128

Further reading
 Akashi, Norio. (1964). The Murray Mission to Japan 1873-1879, a Study in Cultural Relations. Thesis (M.S.), University of Wisconsin–Madison. OCLC 608618069

External links
 
 

1830 births
1905 deaths
American expatriates in Japan
Foreign advisors to the government in Meiji-period Japan
Foreign educators in Japan
Rutgers University faculty
American school principals